AIP may refer to:

Arts, entertainment and media 
 Action International Pictures
 Afghan Islamic Press
 AIP Records, a record label
 American International Pictures, an independent film production/distribution company, now a subsidiary of MGM
 Art Institute of Pittsburgh
 Artistic Infusion Program, a program of the United States Mint, established in 2003

Aviation
 Aeronautical Information Publication
 Airport Improvement Program

Medicine
 Aryl hydrocarbon receptor interacting protein
 Acute intermittent porphyria
 Acute interstitial pneumonitis, Hamman-Rich syndrome
 Autoimmune pancreatitis

Non-profit organizations
 American Institute of Parliamentarians
 American Institute of Philanthropy
 American Institute of Physics
 Australian Institute of Physics

Political organizations
 Alaskan Independence Party
 American Independent Party
 Azərbaycan İslam Partiyası, Azerbaijan Islamic Party

Other uses
 Adaptive Internet Protocol, a protocol used by Sun Secure Global Desktop
 Agreement in principle, a stepping stone to a contract
 Air-independent propulsion, a technology used in submarines
 Air Injection Pump, a component of the air injection system of an engine
 Archival information package, a component of the Open Archival Information System model
 Arrow information paradox, whereby proprietary information loses market value once revealed
 Astrophysical Institute Potsdam

See also 
 Aluminium phosphide (AlP), with a lower-case L instead of an I